The National University of the Northeast (Spanish: Universidad Nacional del Nordeste, UNNE) is an Argentine national university. It is located in the cities of Corrientes and Resistencia, capital cities of the Provinces of Corrientes and Chaco respectively, and was established on December 4, 1956. Known as the University of the Sun, it was the seventh-largest university in Argentina by student enrollment numbers as of 2017.

Schools
Faculty of Architecture and Urbanism
Faculty of Arts
Faculty of Agrarian and Forest Sciences
Faculty of Agroindustry
Faculty of Economic Sciences
Faculty of Exact Sciences
The Faculty of Exact Sciences consists of 9 academic departments; namely Agricultural Science, Biology, Biochemistry, Physics, Humanities, Informatics, Engineering, Mathematics and Chemistry. These departments offer undergraduate and post-graduate courses. Innovative dual language post-graduate courses have been taught in the faculty of mathematics by internationally distinguished professors such as Bharath Sriraman on topics of Theories and Philosophies of Mathematics Education,. 
Faculty of Law
Faculty of Medical Sciences
Faculty of Natural Sciences and Museum
Faculty of Veterinary Sciences
Faculty of Humanities and Social Sciences
Faculty of Informatics
Faculty of Engineering
Faculty of Odontology

See also
List of Argentine universities
Science and technology in Argentina

References

External links

Science and education in Argentina
Argentine Higher Education official site

Northeast
Educational institutions established in 1956
Universities in Chaco Province
Universities in Corrientes Province
1956 establishments in Argentina